"What Do I Know" is a song recorded by American country music band Ricochet. It was released on December 4, 1995, as their debut single, and was served as the first single from their self-titled debut album. The song reached #5 on the Billboard Hot Country Singles & Tracks chart in April 1996. It was written by Stephony Smith, Sunny Russ and Cathy Majeski.

Critical reception
In a summary of the band's career, Billboard magazine called the song a "harmony-laden ballad."

Charts

Weekly charts

Year-end charts

Other recordings
 "What Do I Know" was recorded by country singer Linda Davis, appearing on her 1996 album Some Things Are Meant to Be.

References

1995 debut singles
1995 songs
Linda Davis songs
Ricochet (band) songs
Songs written by Cathy Majeski
Songs written by Sunny Russ
Songs written by Stephony Smith
Song recordings produced by Ron Chancey
Columbia Records singles